H. gigas  may refer to:
 Harpactira gigas, a tarantula native to South Africa
 Hippotragus gigas, an extinct species of antelope
 Holmskioldia gigas, a flowering plant species found in Kenya and Tanzania
 Hyaenodon gigas, an extinct mammal species
 Hydrodamalis gigas, an extinct sirenian
 Hydrodynastes gigas, a rear-fanged venomous colubrid species found in South America
 Hysterocrates gigas, a tarantula native to Cameroon

See also
 Gigas (disambiguation)